A by-election for the electoral district of North West Central in Western Australia took place on 17 September 2022 following the resignation of the sitting member, Nationals MP Vince Catania, on 8 August 2022. The election was won by National Party candidate Merome Beard.

Background
Vince Catania was initially elected to the electoral district of North West Central in 2008 as a Labor Party candidate, but he defected to the National Party in 2009. He had since won the 2013, 2017 and 2021 state elections as a National Party candidate. His margin at the 2021 election was only 259 votes, making it one of the closest seats in the state. In June 2022, Catania announced his intention to resign from Parliament in August 2022. At the time, he was one of four National Party members in the Legislative Assembly. As the Liberal Party only had two members in the Legislative Assembly, the National Party was the senior party in the opposition alliance.

Catania tendered his resignation to the speaker on 8 August 2022. The election is scheduled to occur on 17 September 2022.

Candidates
The National Party chose Carnarvon hotel and pub owner Merome Beard as their candidate in late June. She was the only person nominated for preselection.

The Liberal Party chose Will Baston as their candidate on 13 July. He was the only person nominated for preselection. If he were to win the by-election, the National and Liberal parties would have three seats each, making it unclear which party would be the opposition party. The opposition leader and deputy opposition leader are determined by who is the leader and deputy leader of the opposition party. The opposition party also gets additional staff and resources. There is no known precedent or tiebreaker for when multiple parties have the same number of seats.

Labor was yet to decide if it will put forward a candidate as of mid-July, with there being little upside to winning considering the party already had 53 out of 59 seats in the Legislative Assembly. Premier Mark McGowan was opposed to fielding a candidate, whereas cabinet minister Alannah MacTiernan was strongly in favour. By 8 August, Labor had decided not to field a candidate, with McGowan saying that by-elections historically have been difficult for governments to win. Out of the 11 by-elections from 2008 to 2022, incumbent governments have not contested five. The opposition used Labor's lack of candidacy to suggest that the government doesn't care about regional areas.

The Greens preselected Exmouth local Niels Glahn-Bertelsen, an educator and environmentalist.

In total, there are 12 candidates, a record number for North West Central. Out of those candidates, three live in the electorate: Beard, Baston and Glahn-Bertelsen. The full list of candidates, in ballot order, is as follows:

Election results

References

Western Australian state by-elections
2022 elections in Australia
2020s in Western Australia
September 2022 events in Australia